Spinomantis brunae (common name: Bruna's stream frog) is a species of frogs in the family Mantellidae. It is endemic to Madagascar and known from the Anosy Mountains in southeastern Madagascar.

Description
Males measure  in snout–vent length. Females are unknown. The dorsum is olive green with a reticulated pattern of dark brown spots. The flanks have white spots. The digit and toe pads bear a pair of white spots. The iris is creamy white. The tympanum is distinct. The body is granular dorsally, with weakly granular flanks and belly. The fingers and toes bear enlarged, triangular disks. Males have a subgular vocal sac.

Habitat and conservation
It lives in crevices among boulders and rocky areas, usually close to flowing water. Its breeding habitat is unknown but could be flowing water; one male was observed to call on  a branch half a metre above the ground by a small stream.

This species is locally moderately common. However, the frog is threatened by habitat loss caused by subsistence agriculture, logging, and expanding human settlements. It occurs in the Andohahela National Park.

References

brunae
Endemic frogs of Madagascar
Amphibians described in 1998
Taxa named by Frank Glaw
Taxa named by Miguel Vences